Meghan Lukens is an American politician and educator serving as a member of the Colorado House of Representatives for the 26th district. Elected in November 2022, she assumed office on January 9, 2023.

Early life and education 
Born and raised in Steamboat Springs, Colorado, Lukens graduated from Steamboat Springs High School. She earned a Bachelor of Arts degree in history from the University of Colorado Boulder and a Master of Arts in educational leadership from the University of Colorado Denver.

Career 
Lukens began her career as a student teacher at Niwot High School in 2015. She worked as a substitute teacher at Steamboat Springs High School in 2016 and joined Peak to Peak Charter School in 2017. Since 2021, she has worked as a social studies teacher at Steamboat Springs High School. Lukens was elected to the Colorado House of Representatives in November 2022 and assumed office on January 9, 2023.

References 

Living people
Colorado Democrats
Members of the Colorado House of Representatives
Women state legislators in Colorado
People from Steamboat Springs, Colorado
People from Routt County, Colorado
University of Colorado Boulder alumni
University of Colorado Denver alumni
Educators from Colorado
Year of birth missing (living people)